The Verbandsliga Hessen-Süd, until 2008 named Landesliga Hessen-Süd, is currently the sixth tier of the German football league system.  Before the introduction of the Regionalligas in 1994, the "Verbandsliga Hessen-S" served as the fourth tier of the German league system in the southern part of the state of Hesse. The league also served as the fifth tier of the league system before the introduction of the 3. Liga in 2008

Overview 
The Verbandsliga Hessen-Süd was formed in 1965 as the Landesliga Hessen-Süd, a tier four feeder league to the then Amateurliga Hessen.

The winners of the Verbandsliga Süd are automatically promoted to the Hessenliga, the runners-up need to compete with the runners-up of the Verbandsliga Hessen-Nord and the Verbandsliga Hessen-Mitte and the 15th placed team of the Hessenliga for another promotion spot.

The Verbandsliga Hessen-Süd is fed by the Gruppenliga Hessen-Darmstadt, Hessen-Frankfurt West and Hessen-Frankfurt Ost. The winners of those are automatically promoted to the Verbandsliga, the runners-up play-off for another promotion spot.

One Bavarian club plays within the area of the Verbandsliga Süd. FC Bayern Alzenau and, formerly, Viktoria Aschaffenburg have played in this league in the past. In 1992, FC Bayern Alzenau switched leagues, coming from the Landesliga Bayern-Nord straight across to the Verbandsliga Hessen-Süd and now, having been promoted, play in the Hessenliga. Viktoria Aschaffenburg have previously been promoted too, but in the 2010–11 season played in the Verbandsliga again. In 2012, Viktoria re-joined the Bavarian leagues.

Up until 1973 it was common for teams to move between Landesligen, resulting in the fact that some teams have won titles in two different Landesligen. This practice has since stopped.

Along with the renaming of the Oberliga Hessen to Hessenliga in 2008, the Landesliga was renamed Verbandsliga Hessen-Süd.

League champions 
The league champions:

Verbandsliga 
The league champions since the renaming of the league in 2008:

 VfR Bürstadt declined promotion in 2014, runners-up SpVgg Oberrad promoted instead.

Landesliga 
The league champions until the renaming of the league in 2008:

 Four clubs have won the league three times each, Rot-Weiss Frankfurt, SpVgg 05 Bad Homburg, SC Viktoria 06 Griesheim and SG Egelsbach. However, SpVgg 05 Bad Homburg has also won the Landesliga Mitte in 1972, making it four Landesliga titles.
 Like SpVgg 05 Bad Homburg, FC Hanau 93, SV Wiesbaden and Kickers Offenbach II have also won titles in the Landesliga Süd and Mitte.

Additionally promoted teams 
These clubs were promoted to the Oberliga after finishing second in the league:

 Rot-Weiss Frankfurt holds the record for promotion to the Oberliga Hessen from Landesliga Süd, having achieved it four times.

References

Sources 
 Deutschlands Fußball in Zahlen,  DSFS
 Süddeutschlands Fußballgeschichte in Tabellenform 1897–1988  by Ludolf Hyll
 Die Deutsche Liga-Chronik 1945–2005  DSFS 2006

External links 
 Hessischer Fußball-Verband – HFV 

 

Hessen-Sud
Football competitions in Hesse
1965 establishments in West Germany